Kaysone Phomvihane (13 December 1920 – 21 November 1992) was the first leader of the Communist Lao People's Revolutionary Party from 1955 until his death in 1992. After the Communists seized power in the wake of the Laotian Civil War, he was the de facto leader of Laos from 1975 until his death. He served as the first Prime Minister of the Lao People's Democratic Republic from 1975 to 1991 and then as the second President from 1991 to 1992.

Biography

Kaysone was born Nguyễn Cai Song (although he also used the name Nguyễn Trí Mưu for a short period in the 1930s) in Na Seng village, Khanthabouli district, French Indochina (now Kaysone Phomvihane District, Savannakhet Province, Laos). His father, Nguyễn Trí Loan, was Vietnamese and his mother, Nang Dok, was Lao. He had two sisters: Nang Souvanthong, living in Thailand, and Nang Kongmany, who lived in the USA.

He attended law school at University of Indochina in Hanoi alongside fellow future revolutionary Nouhak Phoumsavan, but dropped out to fight the French colonialists in Vietnam. Later, he joined the Pathet Lao movement,

He became an active revolutionary while studying in Hanoi during the 1940s, establishing the Lao People's Liberation Army (LPLA) on 20 January 1949 and becoming the Minister of Defense of the Resistance Government (Neo Lao Issara) from 1950. In 1955, he was instrumental in setting up the LPRP at Xam Neua in the north, and subsequently served as the Pathet Lao leader. For several years, he mostly stayed in the background, with Prince Souphanouvong serving as the Pathet Lao's figurehead. In the years which followed, he led communist forces against the Kingdom of Laos and U.S. forces. 

Kaysone came out of the shadows in December 1975, shortly after the Pathet Lao took Vientiane, and seized control of the country. At a National Conference of People's Representatives that opened on December 1, Kaysone declared the abolition of the monarchy and the establishment of a republic. The following day, on a motion by presiding officer Kaysone, the National Conference accepted King Sisavang Vatthana's abdication, abolished the monarchy, and proclaimed the Lao People's Democratic Republic. Kaysone nominated Souphanouvong as first president, while he was named prime minister, which he held until becoming president in 1991. Along the way, he married Thongvin Phomvihane.

Under Kaysone's watch, the process of demarcating the border between Laos and Vietnam started in 1977 and finished in 2007. According to Western journalists, the border is "very close" to the 1945 French-made border between Laos and Annam.

According to Vatthana Pholsena, assistant professor of Southeast Asian Studies at the National University of Singapore and author of the book "Post-War Laos", Kaysone was "the top policy maker and a strongman in the LPDR". He created Sekong Province to honour the southern minority for their support in the war effort.

Kaysone died in Vientiane on 21 November 1992. After his death, the government of Laos built a museum in his honor, partially funded by Vietnam.

In 2012, his cremated ashes were transferred from their original resting place to the newly built National Cemetery.

Family
Kaysone had four sons: Saysomphone, Thongsavanh, Sanyahak, and Santiphap, all of whom went on to hold important positions in the LPRP. Saysomphone served as President of the Lao Front for National Construction and currently serves as President of the National Assembly. Thongsavanh is the head of the LPRP External Relations Committee. Sanyahak was elected to the LPRP Central Committee at the 8th LPRP Congress and became a Major General at the age of 40 in 2008. However, he suffered an early death on 19 July 2013 at the age of 45. Santiphap currently serves as Governor of Savannakhet Province.

Foreign honours
 : Knight of the Order of the Rajamitrabhorn
 : Grand Cross of the Order of José Martí
 : Gold Star Order
 : Grand Collar of the Order of Sikatuna
 : Star of the Republic of Indonesia, 1st Class
 : Grand Star of the Decoration of Honour for Services to the Republic of Austria
 :
Order of Lenin
Order of Friendship of Peoples

See also
Kaysone Phomvihane Museum

References

|-

|-

|-

|-

1920 births
1992 deaths
Heads of the Central Committee of the Lao People's Revolutionary Party
Members of the 1st Central Committee of the Lao People's Party
Members of the 2nd Central Committee of the Lao People's Revolutionary Party
Members of the 3rd Central Committee of the Lao People's Revolutionary Party
Members of the 4th Central Committee of the Lao People's Revolutionary Party
Members of the 5th Central Committee of the Lao People's Revolutionary Party
Members of the 2nd Politburo of the Lao People's Revolutionary Party
Members of the 3rd Politburo of the Lao People's Revolutionary Party
Members of the 4th Politburo of the Lao People's Revolutionary Party
Members of the 5th Politburo of the Lao People's Revolutionary Party
Members of the 2nd Secretariat of the Lao People's Revolutionary Party
Members of the 3rd Secretariat of the Lao People's Revolutionary Party
Members of the 4th Secretariat of the Lao People's Revolutionary Party
Lao People's Revolutionary Party politicians
People of the Vietnam War
Presidents of Laos
Prime Ministers of Laos
Laotian people of Vietnamese descent
Laotian politicians of Vietnamese descent
People from Savannakhet province
Revolutionaries